The following lists the number-one albums on the Australian Albums Chart, during the 1990s. The source for this decade is the ARIA Charts.

1990

1991

 1 The Grease soundtrack spent nine of its weeks at number one in 1978, and four in the 1990s—three in 1991 and one in 1998.

1992

1993

1994

1995

1996

1997

1998

1999

 2 Celine Dion's All the Way... A Decade of Song officially spent two weeks at number one, but as this page lists week ending dates (Sundays) and the pages pertaining to the 2000s lists week beginning dates (Mondays), the second week is not listed on the number-one albums of 2000.

See also
Music of Australia
List of UK Albums Chart number ones of the 1990s

1990s
Number-one albums
Australia Albums